Short people may refer to:

 People of short stature
 
 People with dwarfism
 Pygmy peoples
 List of the verified shortest people
 "Short People", a song by Randy Newman
 "Short People", a film based on the life of Maclean King

See also 

 Human height